Two examples of kairō,  is the Japanese version of a cloister, a covered corridor originally built around the most sacred area of a Buddhist temple, a zone which contained the kondō and the tō.

The kairō and the rōmon were among the most important among the garan elements which appeared during the Heian period. The first surrounded the holiest part of the garan, while the second was its main exit. Neither was originally characteristic of Shinto shrines, but in time they often came to replace the traditional shrine surrounding fence called  tamagaki. The earliest example of a kairō/rōmon complex can be found at Iwashimizu Hachiman-gū, a shrine now but a former . The rōmon is believed to have been built in 886, and the kairō roughly at the same time. Itsukushima Jinja is an example of the mature form of the complex.

Two types of kairō exist, one 1-bay wide and another 2-bay wide, the bay being the space between two pillars. The first is by far the most common.

Tanrō

The 1-bay wide type is supported by just two rows of pillars and is therefore called . Typical windows called  (see gallery) let air and light in.

Fukurō

The 2-bay wide type is supported by three rows of pillars, is called  and is divided in two identical corridors by a wall (see model in the gallery). Although it is known that several existed at major Buddhist temples, for example at Tōdai-ji, none is extant. Some fukurō survive however at Shinto shrines.

Gallery

See also
 Glossary of Shinto

References

Japanese Buddhist architecture
Japanese architectural features
Shinto architecture
Colonnades